Ernst Seifert (9 May 1855 – 27 April 1928) was a German organ builder and founder of a company named after him. 

In 1885 he founded his company in Cologne-Mannsfeld.

Organs by Seifert are found in the following churches:

 1898 St. Gereon's Basilica, Cologne
 1903 Christus-Church, Mönchengladbach, 
 1907 Kevelaer Basilica 
 1907  Quirinus Münster, Neuss 
 1909 St. Peter's Church, Kettwig 
 1912 Alternberg Cathedral, Altenberg
 1912 St. Matthias Church, Cologne-Bayenthal

References 

 

German pipe organ builders
1855 births
1928 deaths
Musical instrument manufacturing companies of Germany